Stéphan L'Enflé (born November 7, 1982 in Mauritius) is a football player who currently plays for SS Capricorne in the Réunion Division 2. He has also represented Mauritius internationally with the Mauritius national football team. He is featured on the Mauritian national team in the official 2010 FIFA World Cup video game.

References 

1982 births
Living people
Mauritian footballers
Mauritius international footballers
Mauritian expatriate footballers
Mauritian Premier League players
AS Port-Louis 2000 players
Curepipe Starlight SC players
Association football defenders
Mauritian expatriate sportspeople in Réunion
Expatriate footballers in Réunion